The Day is the debut extended play by South Korean rock band Day6. It was released by JYP Entertainment on September 7, 2015. The extended play features six original tracks.

It is the only album to feature member Junhyeok, who left the band on February 27, 2016.

Track listing

Charts

Sales

Release history

References 

JYP Entertainment EPs
Korean-language EPs
2015 debut EPs
Genie Music EPs
Day6 EPs